Aurora's Sunrise (Armenian: Արշալույսի լուսաբացը) is a 2022 internationally co-produced animated documentary film directed by Inna Sahakyan. It is based on the life of Aurora Mardiganian, an Armenian Genocide survivor who after her escape became an actress in the United States. The film includes short scenes of the film Auction of Souls, a silent film from 1919 on the Armenian Genocide, in which Aurora Mardiganian had the leading role.

Synopsis 
Aurora Mardiganian was born into a large family in Eastern Anatolia. After her father was killed, her family was sent on to death marches where many of her relatives died. She was then sold into a Turkish harem from where she eventually manages to flee first to St.Petersburg in Russia and later to New York. There, her biography became some sort of a success and a book was written about it and a film was produced about the Armenian Genocide in which Mardiganian played the leading role.

Production 
Shahanyan began its development in 2014 but she had no prior experience in making an animated film. Since 2015 the Zoryan Institute supported the realization of the film by signing an agreement with Bars Media. The Zoryan Institute provided interviews with Aurora Mardiganian, it recorded before Mardiganians death. The decision to make an animated documentary from her story, was motivated because animation enabled much more freedom in expression techniques. Armenian colors and symbols were included in the film and the paper cutout CG animation technique was used, where only a few frames per second are animated. The film began to be produced in 2019, but the process was disrupted by the COVID-19 pandemic and then also the conflict between Azerbaijan and Armenia in 2020. At the time of the conflict the production was helped strongly by Lithuanians and the Germans. The film is a co-production of Bars Media from Armenia, Artbox from Lithuania and the Beetz Borthers from Germany.

Release 
The film premiered in June 2022 when it was shown at the Annecy International Animation Festival. It premiered in Yerevan, the capital of Armenia in November. It is Armenians entry to the Academy Awards for International Feature Film in 2023, becoming the second animated documentary film to be nominated for that section after Flee from Denmark in 2022. For 2023, Eternal Spring, another animated feature film from Canada, also competes at the Academy Awards.

Awards and recognition 

 October 2022 Audience Award at Animation Is Film
 November 2022 Asia Pacific Screen Award for Best Animated Feature Film
 2022 Armenia's entry to the Academy Awards

References

External links

2022 films
2022 animated films
2022 documentary films
Armenian documentary films
German animated films
German documentary films
Lithuanian documentary films
Armenian-language films
2020s English-language films
2020s Turkish-language films
Kurdish-language films
2020s German-language films
2020s German films
Armenian genocide films